Oscar Bobb (born 12 July 2003) is a Norwegian footballer currently playing as a forward for Manchester City.

Club career

Early career and move to Portugal
Born in Oslo, Bobb played for Lyn at youth level. In 2013, he began being linked with Portuguese club Porto, after performing well at a youth tournament in Algarve. Porto reached out to Bobb's mother, to convince the young footballer to sign with them, even going as far as to pay for the two of them to visit the club in Porto. In October 2015, Gunnes moved to Portugal on her own, before signing documentation in November of the same year for Bobb to be enrolled in the Portuguese Football Federation.

Despite the documentation being rejected by FIFA in January 2016, Bobb and his mother remained in Porto, and in January 2017 he attempted to sign with Escola de Futebol Hernâni Gonçalves. However, FIFA were not convinced that Bobb's mother had moved to Portugal of her own volition, to pursue an acting career, nor that the Escola de Futebol Hernâni Gonçalves were independent from Porto, and refused Bobb an international transfer certificate.

The case reached the Court of Arbitration for Sport, who sided with FIFA, and Bobb was told to return to Norway. He would go on to sign for fellow Oslo-based club Vålerenga.

Manchester City
Bobb joined Premier League side Manchester City in July 2019. In October of the same year, he was named by English newspaper The Guardian as the best young talent at Manchester City of his age group.

After a relatively slow start, compared to other youth players brought in at the same time, Bobb cemented his place in Manchester City's under-23 side, notching a number of assists in his first full season. As a reward for his fine form for the reserve side, Bobb was named on the Manchester City bench for the first time, in an FA Cup third round tie against Swindon Town on 7 January 2022, though he did not feature.

Style of play
Comfortable on the ball, and described by Manchester City as a "incredibly technically gifted midfielder", Bobb has been compared to Argentine football legend Lionel Messi for his style of play.

Career statistics

Club

Notes

References

External links

2003 births
Living people
Footballers from Oslo
Norwegian footballers
Norway youth international footballers
Association football forwards
Lyn Fotball players
Vålerenga Fotball players
Manchester City F.C. players
Norwegian expatriate footballers
Norwegian expatriate sportspeople in Portugal
Expatriate footballers in Portugal
Norwegian expatriate sportspeople in England
Expatriate footballers in England